Sheikh Mohammed bin Abdulla Al Thani (born 16 June 1982), known as Moe Al Thani,  is a Qatari-Emirati Sheikh, Philanthropist, Management Professional and sportsman. He is known for being the first Qatari to have climbed up Mount Everest and have reached the Seven Summits, the South Pole as well as Ama Dablam.

Early life and education 
As son of Sheikh Abdullah bin Muhammad bin Ali al Thani, Sheikh Mohammed is a member of the Qatari House of Al Thani as well as the Emirati Al-Qasimi royal family though his paternal grandmother, who is the sister of the current Emir of Sharjah.

Sheikh Mohammed graduated from the American University of Sharjah with a Bachelors of Science in Marketing and Accounting and a Master of Business Administration (MBA). He studied Business Administration extensively at Harvard Business School, receiving Alumni Status.

Mountaineering 
Sheikh Mohammed became the first Qatari to reach the summit of Mount Everest on 22 May 2013. He is the first Qatari man to reach the Seven Summits; reach "the bottom of the world" and "ski the last degree" to the South Pole in commemoration of Qatar’s National Day on 18 December 2012; and summit Ama Dablam, at an altitude of 6812 meters, on 11 November 2020.

During the Everest climb, he was part of a four-member group called Arabs with Altitude, which included the first Palestinian man, Raed Zidan, the first Saudi woman Raha Moharrak and Iranian, Masoud Mohammed, to reach the summit of Mount Everest. Arabs with Altitude received global media coverage upon their return from Mount Everest.

Al Thani is currently dedicated to becoming the first Qatari to reach the Explorers Grand Slam (conquering the 7 summits and the South and the North Pole). He is on the last leg of a long journey to gain the Grand Slam title, becoming one of only 50 people in history and the first Qatari to ever reach this title.

Record of mountaineering 
Sheikh Mohammed´s record as a mountaineer included the following achievements:

 Mount Kilimanjaro, Tanzania - 5895 meters (March 2010) 
 Mont Blanc, France - 4810 meters (September 2011) 
 Mount Kilimanjaro, Tanzania - 5895 meters (November 2011)
 Mount Vinson, Antarctica - 4892 meters (December 2012)
 Mount Elbrus, Russia - 5642 meters (August 2012)
 Mount Kosciuszko, Australia - 2228 meters (October 2012)
 Mount Aconcagua, Argentina - 6962 meters (January 2013)
 Mount Everest, Nepal/Tibet - 8850 meters (May 2013)
 Denali, United States - 6144 meters (May 2016)
 Mount Kilimanjaro, Tanzania - 5895 meters (March 2018) 
 Everest Base Camp, Nepal - 5364 meters (April 2019)
 Mount Kilimanjaro, Tanzania - 5895 meters (February 2020) 
 Mount Ama Dablam, Nepal - 6812 meters (November 2020)

Philanthropy 
Al Thani climbed as a brand ambassador for Reach Out To Asia, a private non-profit organization, based in Doha, Qatar that raises funds to uplift Asia and parts of the Middle East. Al Thani's goal was to raise one million dollars for education projects in Nepal.

Sheikh Mohammed also successfully led from 2 to 12 October 2014, the "Elevate to Educate" fundraising trip for a group of 12 young Qataris to the Summit of Kilimanjaro.

He currently leads "Rise 2 Success" climbs every year, which invites anyone, from any part of the world, to join Moe on a journey of self-discovery. He invites people who are at a point in their lives asking themselves "what now?" According to Moe, "the effects of being in this journey may include happiness, fulfillment, clarity and maybe even enlightenment! The journey, however, is not always an easy road. Finding your purpose is a life long adventure." He invites his social media followers to apply.

Management and leadership 
Al Thani is a Doha-based entrepreneur and motivational public speaker.  He is one of the young prominent leaders in the Gulf region, with a focus on fitness, hospitality, and tourism. 

In August 2007, Al Thani founded the travel website Musafir.com and Twisted Olive, a contemporary bistro with modern comfort food, inside Burj Doha, Qatar in 2020 as well as Altitude Elite, a boutique personalized-training studio in Lusail, Qatar in 2019. .

Vodafone Qatar 
Sheikh Mohammed served as a board member of Vodafone Qatar from year 2013-2016.

Air Arabia 
In 2011 he became part of the board of directors of Air Arabia alongside his father Sheikh Abdullah bin Mohammed al Thani.

Chairmanships 
Sheikh Mohammed held several Chairmanships, which include:

Air Arabia
Gamma Aviation Middle East
AM Holding Company 
SASCO 
Santos International Company 
Ascent Advertising Company
Universal Tourism Company

Deputy chairmanships
Sharjah Golf and Shooting Club

Memberships  
Young Presidents’ Organization (YPO) Qatar Chapter - 2018
The Explorers Club - 2016

Sharjan statemanship 
In the field of statemanship, Sheikh Mohammed was appointed as Director General of the Sharjah Statistics Centre in January 2012. He also served as a chairman of the Department of Community Development of the Emirate of Sharjah and member of the Executive Council of the Emirate of Sharjah, being appointed by his granduncle Emir Sultan bin Muhammad Al-Qasimi of Sharjah. He was notwithstanding this appointed by his granduncle as the head of his office at the American University of Sharjah.

Filmography 
Al Thani is featured in The Seventh Summit, a documentary that follows a group of men and one woman in their attempt to make it to the top of Mount Denali in Alaska. Among the climbers are Qatar’s own Sheikh Mohammed Al-Thani and Raed Zadan, respectively the first Qatari and the first Palestinian to climb Mount Everest; Iranian Massoud Kalafji; and Suzanne Al Houby, the first Arab woman to scale Everest.

He is also featured in Seal of Approval, which follows the Arabs with Altitude as they summit Mount Everest.

Al Thani made a documentary on the COVID-19 pandemic impact on the Nepali people who rely on the mountaineering industry.

Hereditary titles 
Sheikh (House of Thani and Qasimi)
Sayyid (Descendant of Prophet Muhammad through Ali al-Naqi)

See also 
Sheikh Hasan bin Muhammad al Thani, uncle
Sheikha Maryam bin Hasan al Thani, cousin
Sheikh Ahmed bin Mohammed al Maktoum, Emirati Royal with a Sports Career
HRH Sayyid Sultan Masood Dakik, Afghan Royal descendant of Muhammad with a sports career
HH Prince Karim Agha Khan IV, Iranian Royal with a sports career

References

External links 
 Official website of Moe Al Thani

1982 births
Living people
Summiters of Mount Everest
Qatari businesspeople
People from the Emirate of Sharjah
Qatari people of Emirati descent
Qatari expatriates in the United Arab Emirates
American University of Sharjah alumni